James Albert "Darky" Banks (10 December 1883 – 5 July 1930), the son of a former American slave, was an Australian cricketer and Australian rules footballer. He played two first-class matches for Western Australia between 1908/09 and 1920/21.

Family
The son of Jordan Henry Banks (1832-1887), and Sarah Jane Henry (1849-1940), née McMullen, James Albert Banks was born on the Maryborough goldfields on 10 December 1883. His father, Jordan Henry Banks, was once an American slave:
Mr. Banks's father [Jordan Henry Banks (1832–1887)], a giant of about 6ft. 3in., and built proportionately, and who commanded the respect and good will of all sections in Maryborough, was a slave before the civil war. Such was his great strength that the log cabins, in which runaways were confined on the plantations, were not strong enough to hold him. He was chased and run down by hounds; but ultimately made his escape to freedom via Canada, coming to Australia and settling in Maryborough, where all the family were born. — The Australasian, 29 November 1919.

His brother Thomas Banks (1867-1919) played Australian rules football for Fitzroy in the Victorian Football League.

Football
He played in the West Australian Football League for South Fremantle (148 games) and Perth (39 games), captaining South Fremantle in 1909, 1912 and 1914.

Death
He died at Perth on 5 July 1930.

See also
 List of Western Australia first-class cricketers

References

External links
 James Albert Banks, at WAFL Footy Facts.
 

1883 births
1930 deaths
Australian cricketers
Western Australia cricketers
Australian rules footballers from Victoria (Australia)
South Fremantle Football Club players
Perth Football Club players
Australian people of African-American descent
20th-century African-American people